Riyad Nassan Agha (born 1947) is a former minister of culture of Syria. He served as Syria's ambassador to Oman and the United Arab Emirates. He holds a PhD. degree in philosophy from the University of Damascus.

References

1947 births
Living people
Syrian ministers of culture
Ambassadors of Syria to Oman
Ambassadors of Syria to the United Arab Emirates
Damascus University alumni